The men's 800 metre freestyle competition of the swimming events at the 2019 Pan American Games are scheduled to be held August 8th, 2019 at the Villa Deportiva Nacional Videna cluster.

Records
Prior to this competition, the existing World Record was as follows:

Results

Final
The final round was held on August 8.

References

Swimming at the 2019 Pan American Games